The 2008 CAF Confederation Cup was the fifth edition of the CAF Confederation Cup. Its schedule began with the preliminary round (home and away ties) in mid-February. The competition concluded on 22 November with CS Sfaxien winning the title.

Qualifying rounds

All rounds have been drawn.

Preliminary round
1st legs played on 15–17 February 2008 and 2nd legs played on 29 February–2 March 2008.

First round
1st legs played on 21–23 March 2008 and 2nd legs played on 4–6 April 2008.

Second round
1st legs played on 25–27 April 2008 and 2nd legs played on 9–11 May 2008.

1 The match was abandoned at halftime with Asante Kotoko winning 1-0 due a storm that flooded the pitch. The match was replayed next day.

Play-off round
The 8 winners of the round of 16 play the losers of the round of 16 of the Champions League for 8 places in the group stage.
First leg played 11/12/13 July and second leg played 25/26/27 July

Group stage

The group phase starts on the weekend of 15–17 August and concludes on the weekend of 17–19 October. There are no semi-finals; the group winners meet in a two-legged final.

Group A

Group B

Knockout stage

Final

The  final 2 legs will be played on 8 and 22 November.

Goalscorers
Leading goal scorers including group stage matches.

References

External links
Confederation Cup 2008 - rsssf.com

 
CAF Confederation Cup
2